Law enforcement in Bosnia and Herzegovina is the responsibility of an EU-sponsored Bosnia police force to which the role of maintaining security in the region was handed over from the United Nations's 1,800 strong International Police Task Force. Since 1 January 2003 the European Union Police Mission in Bosnia and Herzegovina (EUPM) was tasked with creating a new stable police force for Bosnia and Herzegovina, however this has been met with limited success. Outlined by the EUPM, the new Bosnian Police force would have the responsibility of fighting migrant smuggling, customs evasions as well as dealing with the tensions raised by the return of refugees.

Creation of the new police system
Since January 1, 2003, the European Union assigned the EUPM the role of creating the new stable police force for Bosnia and Herzegovina, in order to stabilise the region and remove some of the burden shouldered by the peace missions of the United Nations. Both the EUPM and the local government continue to work to create a police force as defined by the European Union.

Steps towards reform
The EUPM laid out three main objectives, to support the fight against organised crime, support police reforms and watch over police actions that are "unlawful, misconducts and contrary to the best practice or generally applied rules of engagement" The first aim led to EUPM's funding for the Bosnian State Investigation and Protection Agency (SIPA), as well as developing the Ministry of Security (MoS) and the State Border Service (SBS). EUPM also works to coordinate between these organisations and both EUFOR and SFOR. The EUPM also funds a number of public information campaigns, primarily targeted at reducing road deaths and drug use in the population. As of May 11, 2007 EUPM have received a total of 168 police officers and civilian personnel from mainstream contributing nations, with France and Germany the leading contributors, and 19 from those that it refers to as "Third States", with Ukraine the leading contributor of these.

In 2005 the Directorate for Police Restructuring was established in the country to aid with the reform of the police services, however new plans for the reforms were unveiled only in December 2006, with the political parties of Bosnia and Herzegovina being invited to discuss the plans on 16 February 2007. Foreign minister Sven Alkalaj visited the United Kingdom in March 2007, where Geoff Hoon, Minister for Europe and Peter Ricketts, Permanent Under Secretary all urged Bosnia to strive for police reform, further discussions took place in Bosnia on 11 April 2007 however little consensus has been reached.

Criticism of the EUPM
Bosnian police statistics state that crime increased 22% in Republika Srpska (the Serbian entity of Bosnia) and 32% in the Bosniak/Croat Federation in 2004. Thus, the EUPM has received much criticism from groups such as the International Crisis Group, and the Bosnian State Investigation and Protection Agency itself, whose director stated that "There are currently 15 police agencies operating in Bosnia. They are uncoordinated or can only co-ordinate voluntarily, which is no good for policy." The EUPM's chief adviser to the SIPA also stated that "The criminals in this part of the world work to best European practice and standards. It is time the police do, too."

A particular criticism is the over complication of the police system in Bosnia and Herzegovina. With the country strongly divided by the Dayton Agreement, there are several police districts operating in a country of only 50,000 km². An EUPM spokesperson illustrated this when stating that "In Sarajevo if a crime is committed on the streets that are part of one of the entities, the Federation, and the criminal drives four, five kilometres outside the centre, he crosses the boundary line into Republika Srpska," A British police officer working with EUPM also highlighted the dangers of a low-performing police force in Bosnia: "It's in a very vulnerable position geographically, in terms of drug producing countries, in terms of trafficking things like drugs and people that find their way into western Europe,"

See also 

 Police of Republika Srpska

Notes